Colonel Leslie MacDill was a United States Army Air Corps officer. MacDill Air Force Base near Tampa, Florida is named in his honor. Colonel MacDill was one of aviation’s early pioneers.

Biography
Colonel MacDill was born at Monmouth, Illinois, on 18 February 1889. Following his graduation in 1909 from Hanover College with an A.B. degree, and from Indiana University in 1911 with an A.M. degree, he was commissioned from civilian life as a second lieutenant, Coast Artillery Corps, on 13 April 1912.

He served with the 6th Company, Coast Artillery Corps from 10 December 1912, until his detail in 1914 in the Aviation Section, Signal Corps. Upon completion of his flying training at the Signal Corps Aviation School at San Diego, California, he was rated a Junior Military Aviator on 2 July 1915, which automatically advanced him to the rank of first lieutenant. He was promoted to captain on 15 May 1917; he commanded a training group assigned to Foggio Italy in 1917. His second in command was future mayor of New York Fiorello LaGuardia; he was promoted to Major 1 July 1920; to lieutenant colonel 1 August 1935; and to colonel on 26 August 1936.

Death
Colonel MacDill died as the result of an airplane crash on the morning of 9 November 1938, in Washington D.C. The accident occurred several minutes after his takeoff from Bolling Field in a BC-1 aircraft.

Accounts pieced together from numerous eyewitnesses indicated that something went wrong with the motor. Colonel MacDill first tried to get back to Bolling Field, and then with death staring him in the face, aimed his plane for a narrow space between two houses. The descending plane cut down telephone and power wires, knocked down a pole, clipped off tree limbs, plunged to the ground and burst into flames. Colonel MacDill and his passenger Private Joseph G. Gloxner were killed instantly.

References
MacDill AFB biography
United States Army biography

1889 births
1938 deaths
Accidental deaths in Washington, D.C.
United States Army personnel of World War I
Aviators killed in aviation accidents or incidents in the United States
Aviation pioneers
Hanover College alumni
Indiana University Bloomington alumni
People from Monmouth, Illinois
United States Army Air Forces colonels
Victims of aviation accidents or incidents in 1938
Military personnel from Illinois